The Bainbridge Subdivision is a railroad line owned by CSX Transportation in Georgia. The line runs from Bainbridge south to Attapulgus for a total of 13.3 miles. At its north end it continues south from the Georgia Southwestern Railroad and connects with CSX's Dothan Subdivision and at its south end it connects to the Florida Gulf & Atlantic Railroad's Bainbridge Subdivision, which continues south to Tallahassee, Florida.

History

The Bainbridge Subdivision was first built in 1901 by the Georgia Pine Railway.  The line was only intended to be a shortline for logging, but since it provided an additional rail route from Georgia into Florida, traffic increased.  As a result, the line was renamed the Georgia, Florida and Alabama Railway by the end of 1901.  The GF&A Railway bought the Carrabelle, Tallahassee and Georgia Railroad in 1906, which ran from Tallahassee south to Carrabelle.

The Georgia, Florida and Alabama Railway, which extended from Richland, Georgia to Carrabelle, Florida at its greatest extent, became part of the Seaboard Air Line Railroad in 1927.  Seaboard Air Line would become part of CSX Transportation by 1986.  GF&A track north of Bainbridge is now part of the Georgia Southwestern Railroad.

CSX sold the southern segment of the Bainbridge Subdivision from Attapulgus to Tallahassee to the Florida Gulf & Atlantic Railroad in 2019.

See also
 List of CSX Transportation lines

References

CSX Transportation lines
Rail infrastructure in Florida
Rail infrastructure in Georgia (U.S. state)